Soulcrusher is the debut album by American hard rock band Operator. The album sold over 110,000 copies and peaked at number 14 on the Billboard Heatseekers chart.

Use in media
The song "The Only One" was used as the theme song for the first season of the television series UFO Hunters.
The song "Nothing to lose" was used in the hit game Burnout Paradise.
The song "The Only One" was originally the song Bryan Bay uses in the AGK Series but due to copyright, it got changed.

Track listing 
All tracks written by Johnny Strong, except where noted.
"Soulcrusher" – 3:35
"Nothing to Lose" (Strong, Wade Carpenter) – 3:52
"Make 'Em Pay" – 3:55
"So Little Time" – 3:47
"Delicate" – 4:26
"What You Get" – 4:34
"The Only One" – 2:50
"Burn Up the Road" – 3:47
"Black Cloud" – 4:15
"Good Enough" – 3:46
"Live Your Way" – 7:39

Personnel
 Johnny Strong – lead vocals, guitar, bass guitar
 Paul Phillips – rhythm guitar, backing vocals 
 Ricki Lixx – lead guitar, backing vocals 
 Wade Carpenter – bass guitar, backing vocals 
 Dorman Pantfoeder – drums, percussion

Singles

References

2007 debut albums
Operator (band) albums